Senator Blackwell may refer to:

Kevin Blackwell (politician) (born 1954), Mississippi State Senate
Slade Blackwell (born 1968), Alabama State Senate